The 1st CC.NN. Division "Dio lo Vuole" ("God wills it"), was one of the three Italian Blackshirts Divisions sent to Spain during the Spanish Civil War to make up the "Corpo Truppe Volontarie" (Corps of Volunteer Troops), or CTV.

1st CC.NN. Division "Dio lo vuole" – Bgd. Gen. Edmondo Rossi 
 1st Group of Banderas – Lt. Coronel Aristide Frezza.
 533 Bandera "Aquila"
 ? Bandera "Leone"
 524 Bandera "Carroccio" – Mayor Luigi Giulani
 Support Battery 65/17
 Engineers Section
 2nd Group of Banderas – Colonel Costantino Salvi
 235 Bandera "Indomita" – Seniore Alberto Montanardi
 Bandera "Folgore" – 1st Seniore Michele Olivas
 Bandera "Falco" – Seniore Arnaldo Rocchi
 Support Battery 65/17 "Centauro"
 Engineers Section
 3rd Grupo de Banderas – Coronel Mario Mazza.
 640 bis Bandera "Lupi"  
 524 Bandera "Uragano"
 635 Bandera "Tempesta"
 Support Battery 65/17
 Engineers Section
 "Carabinieri" Section
 Intendencia Section
 Sanitation Section
 Truck Unit

The Blackshirt (Camicie Nere, or CC.NN.) Divisions contained regular soldiers and volunteer militia from the National Fascist Party. The CC.NN. divisions were semi-motorised.

Sources 
de Mesa, José Luis, El regreso de las legiones: (la ayuda militar italiana a la España nacional, 1936–1939),  García Hispán, Granada:España, 1994 

Divisions of Italy in the Spanish Civil War
Blackshirt divisions of Italy